Boubacar Fofana (born 6 November 1989) is a Guinean professional footballer who plays for Portuguese club B-SAD as a defensive midfielder.

Career statistics

Club

International

Honours
Sepsi OSK 
Cupa României: 2021–22

References

External links

1989 births
Living people
Sportspeople from Conakry
Guinean footballers
Association football midfielders
Primeira Liga players
Liga Portugal 2 players
Segunda Divisão players
C.D. Pinhalnovense players
S.C. Praiense players
Gondomar S.C. players
C.D. Tondela players
C.D. Nacional players
Moreirense F.C. players
TFF First League players
Kartalspor footballers
Karlsruher SC players
Saudi Professional League players
Ettifaq FC players
Khaleej FC players
Liga I players
CS Gaz Metan Mediaș players
Sepsi OSK Sfântu Gheorghe players
Liga Leumit players
Ironi Tiberias F.C. players
Belenenses SAD players
Guinea international footballers
2015 Africa Cup of Nations players
2019 Africa Cup of Nations players
Guinean expatriate footballers
Expatriate footballers in Portugal
Expatriate footballers in Turkey
Expatriate footballers in Germany
Expatriate footballers in Saudi Arabia
Expatriate footballers in Romania
Expatriate footballers in Israel
Guinean expatriate sportspeople in Portugal
Guinean expatriate sportspeople in Turkey
Guinean expatriate sportspeople in Germany
Guinean expatriate sportspeople in Saudi Arabia
Guinean expatriate sportspeople in Romania
Guinean expatriate sportspeople in Israel